Thomas Brewster, M.D. (1705–?), was an English doctor and  translator.

Life
Brewster was the son of Benjamin Brewster of Eardisland, Herefordshire, and was born on 18 September 1705. He was educated at Merchant Taylors' School, and thence elected to St John's College, Oxford, in 1724. He graduated B.A. in 1727, M.A. in 1732, B.M. and D.M. in 1738. He was also elected a fellow of his college. While at Oxford he published a translation of the 'Second Satire of Persius,' in English verse by itself, to see, as he says in the preface, how the public would appreciate his work. This was in 1733. The third and fourth 'Satires' were published together in 1742, the fifth in the same year, and the six satires in one volume in 1784. Brewster, after leaving the university, practised medicine at Bath.

References

1705 births
People educated at Merchant Taylors' School, Northwood
Year of death missing
English translators
People from Herefordshire